Ricardo Ruiz is a Mexican-Cherokee visual artist based in Corpus Christi, Texas.

Biography 
Ricardo Ruiz (also known as Ricardo Ruiz the Elder) was born in Corpus Christi, Texas, where he still resides. Ruiz could draw before he could even talk and by the age of three he could draw on command. He is of indigenous Mexican and Cherokee descent and his works are inspired by curanderismo, a traditional folk medicine of Mexico. His paintings are similar in style, and he is influenced by, Hieronymus Bosch, Kerry James Marshall, and Gregory Gillespie. Ruiz primarily works in oil, watercolors, and acrylic, and his paintings focus on Chicano culture, and his own family heritage.  His son, Ricardo V. Ruiz, is an artist and printmaker. Richardo Ruiz the Elder has been working as an artist for over 35 years.

Education 
Ruiz obtained his bachelor's degree in fine arts in 1984 from Corpus Christi State University. Twenty-two years later he returned to graduate school to get his master's degree in fine arts from Texas A&M, Corpus Christi in 2014.

Artworks 
One of Ruiz' well known pieces is his Love Songs for the Palomia, a painting of a grackle wearing a fez hat and in front of a bright green background. He used a grackle as his subject because in Corpus Christi they would always be around him since he was a child. However, he had never seen a dead one so it became an inside joke that grackles have the same longevity as humans which would also give them the same abilities to be civilized as well. The word “Palomia” is slang for “people of the neighborhood” which Ruiz considers an endearing name for the people around him. Many of Ruiz’ inspirations come from a blend of Renaissance art, Catholicism, folklore, and Mexican American culture. Other artists Ruiz finds inspiring are Frida Kahlo, Gregory Gillespie, Thomas Hart Benton, Edward Hopper, and Donald Wilson. His work is described as examining “the commonality of the life experience.”

Exhibitions

Solo exhibitions 

 2015 at the Norman Artwalk inside the Dope Chapel. 
 2019, There Is Something I Want To Tell You. The Narrative Paintings of Ricardo Ruiz, at the Martha Fenstermaker Memorial Visual Arts Gallery at Laredo College.

Group exhibitions 

 1985 - Texas A&M University's Weil Gallery 
 1986 - Art Museum of Southern Texas 
 1999 - Cheech Marin Center for Chicano Art

Collections 
Ricardo Ruiz's works can be found in the permanent collection of Cheech Marin Center for Chicano Art, Texas A&M University Weil Gallery, and the Art Museum of Southern Texas.

References 

Year of birth missing (living people)
Living people
People from Corpus Christi, Texas
Texas A&M University–Corpus Christi alumni
Artists from Texas